Deloneura sheppardi, the Sheppard's buff, is a butterfly in the family Lycaenidae. It is found in eastern Zimbabwe and western Mozambique. Larvae have a blue body and a brown head, and adults are primarily on wing in March and April.

References

Butterflies described in 1934
Deloneura